The Ippi shooting was a mass shooting on 22 February 2021 in North Waziristan, Khyber Pakhtunkhwa, Pakistan.

Shooting
On 22 February 2021, four female aid workers were inside a car when two gunmen on a motorcycle shot them dead in Ippi village, North Waziristan, Khyber Pakhtunkhwa, northwest Pakistan. Four women were killed, and the driver was injured in the attack.

See also
List of terrorist incidents in 2021
List of terrorist incidents in Pakistan since 2001
Sectarian violence in Pakistan

References

2021 in Khyber Pakhtunkhwa
2021 murders in Pakistan
2021 mass shootings in Asia
2020s crimes in Khyber Pakhtunkhwa
21st-century mass murder in Pakistan
February 2021 crimes in Asia
February 2021 events in Pakistan
Mass murder in 2021
Mass murder in Khyber Pakhtunkhwa
Mass shootings in Khyber Pakhtunkhwa
North Waziristan District
Violence against women in Pakistan